Richard James Irving (born 10 September 1975) is an English retired football forward.

He signed for Manchester United as a schoolboy in 1989, and, after leaving school, signed a trainee contract on 13 July 1992. He played in the youth side that were FA Youth Cup runners-up in 1993. He promptly signed professional forms with the club, but never played a first-team game and was transferred to Nottingham Forest in a £75,000 deal at the start of the 1995–96 season. Irving's solitary first-team appearance was as a substitute at home to his former club on 29 November 1995 – a Premier League fixture at the City Ground which ended in a 1–1 draw.

Irving left Forest in the summer of 1997 and signed for Macclesfield Town, who had just won promotion to the Football League as Conference champions. He played nine games in the Division Three 1997–98 campaign which saw Macclesfield secure a second successive promotion, but he left soon afterwards and never played professional football again.

Irving was the subject of an episode of "When The Floodlights Fade" on the in-house Manchester United TV channel MUTV, during which he mentioned spending some time at Aberdeen FC before moving to Macclesfield - a time which he described as a "life experience".

He now franchises lettings agencies and lives in Alderley Edge, Cheshire.

References

External links

Profile at the Post War English & Scottish Football League A - Z Player's Transfer Database

1975 births
Living people
English footballers
Association football forwards
Premier League players
Manchester United F.C. players
Nottingham Forest F.C. players
Macclesfield Town F.C. players
Runcorn F.C. Halton players
People from Alderley Edge
Footballers from Halifax, West Yorkshire
Sportspeople from Cheshire